Peter Denton (10 June 1926 – 1 December 2000) was an Australian pole vaulter who competed in the 1956 Summer Olympics. He was third in the 1950 British Empire Games pole vault. In the 1954 British Empire and Commonwealth Games pole vault he finished eighth. He attended Sydney Boys High School from 1938 to 1943.

References

1926 births
2000 deaths
Australian male pole vaulters
Olympic athletes of Australia
Athletes (track and field) at the 1956 Summer Olympics
Commonwealth Games bronze medallists for Australia
Commonwealth Games medallists in athletics
Athletes (track and field) at the 1950 British Empire Games
Athletes (track and field) at the 1954 British Empire and Commonwealth Games
20th-century Australian people
Medallists at the 1950 British Empire Games